Malleostemon hursthousei is a plant species of the family Myrtaceae endemic to Western Australia.

It blooms between September and November producing pink-white flowers.

It is found on sandplains in the Mid West and Wheatbelt regions of Western Australia between Shark Bay and Moora where it grows in sandy soils.

References

hursthousei
Flora of Western Australia
Plants described in 1983